Bergsåsen is a village in the municipality of Re, Norway. Together with the nearby village Revetal it has a population (SSB 2005) of 1,902.

Villages in Vestfold og Telemark